Georgios Remoundos (Γεώργιος Ρεμούνδος, 1878 in Athens – 27 April 1928) was a Greek mathematician and a founding member of the Academy of Athens in 1926.

After graduating from the Varvakeio, he studied at the University of Athens and was given a government scholarship to study in France. He studied at the École Normale Supérieure and then at the University of Paris, where he received in 1905 his Ph.D. (Thèse de doctorat) with thesis Sur les zéros d'une classe de fonctions transcendantes.
A post-doctoral student of Émile Picard, Remoundos published in French under the name "Georges J. Rémoundos". He was a professor of mathematics at the University of Athens. He was a co-editor and co-founder, along with P. Zervos, N. Sakellarios, and K. Lambiris, of the journal Bulletin de la Société Mathématique de Gréce, first published in May 1919 written about one-third in French and two-thirds in Greek. Remoundos was three times an invited speaker at the International Congress of Mathematicians: in 1908 at Rome, in 1912 at Cambridge (England), and in 1920 at Strasbourg.

Selected publications

References

1878 births
1928 deaths
University of Paris alumni
Academic staff of the National and Kapodistrian University of Athens
20th-century  Greek mathematicians
Scientists from Athens
Members of the Academy of Athens (modern)
19th-century Greek mathematicians